Swayamvaram is a 1982 Indian Telugu film directed by Dasari Narayana Rao and starring Sobhan Babu, Jaya Prada, Rao Gopala Rao and Gummadi. Narayana Rao himself played a supporting role. The film marked the fifth collaboration of the director with actor Sobhan Babu. The film was released on 6 August 1982 alongside actor Krishna's Prema Nakshatram.

Cast 
 Sobhan Babu 
 Jaya Prada 
 Rao Gopala Rao 
 Gummadi 
 Anjali Devi 
 Ramaprabha
 Pushpalatha
 Dasari Narayana Rao 
 Roopa Chakravarthy 
 Gouri
 Sathya Chitra
 Master Purushottam 
 Baby Meena
 Master Phani Kumar

Soundtrack 

Rajasri and Dasari Narayana Rao penned the lyrics for the songs composed by Sathyam.

References

External links 

1980s Telugu-language films
Films directed by Dasari Narayana Rao